The Trinity League is a high school athletic conference in Southern California, part of the CIF Southern Section. The League is regarded as one of the most competitive high school football leagues in the United States; High School Football America rated it the toughest league in 2021, with 3 of its 6 teams ranked in the top 10 in the country and 5 in the top 200.

Members
The league currently includes seven high schools, six in Orange County and one in Los Angeles County. Orange Lutheran, which joined in 2006, is the first member which is not a Catholic school.

History

Angelus League
The Trinity League is the latest iteration of what was originally known as the Angelus League, founded in 1961 to match Catholic high schools—the Angelus is a Catholic devotion. The founding members were Servite (Anaheim), Mater Dei (Santa Ana), St. Paul (Santa Fe Springs), Cantwell (Montebello), and Salesian (Los Angeles). Cantwell and Salesian soon dropped out of the league, due to its competitiveness, and were replaced by St. John Bosco (Bellflower) and Verbum Dei (Los Angeles).

From the outset, the league was marked by intense football rivalries, notably between Mater Dei, Servite, and St. Paul. Some games drew crowds in excess of 10,000 people, and violence was not uncommon. The intensity increased even further in 1967, when St. John Bosco and Verbum Dei dropped out and were replaced by Bishop Amat (La Puente) and Pius X (Downey). Along with St. Anthony (Long Beach), the iconic members of the Angelus League were now set.

Things shifted again in the late 1970s. St. Anthony dropped in 1977 and was replaced by Bishop Montgomery. Pius X dropped in 1980. Bishop Montgomery in 1981. In 1982, Pius X came back a new member, Serra (Gardena) joined. Serra dropped in 1984 and was replaced by Bishop Montgomery again. In 1986 Pius X was gone and replaced by St. Bernard. St. Bernard only lasted two years, and dropped in 1988.

The 1980s saw the league produce future NFLers like Ed Luther (St. Paul), John Sciarra (Bishop Amat), Paul McDonald (Bishop Amat), Turk Schonert ((Servite), Derek Brown (Servite), and Steve Beuerlein, who led Servite to the first of five consecutive CIF championships. Todd Marinovich also played for Mater Dei for two years, before transferring to Capistrano Valley. Major boys' basketball rivalries also emerged in the 1980s, with Mater Dei becoming a powerhouse. Girls' sports were introduced, replacing the former Sunrise League, with St. Joseph's (Lakewood) and Rosary (Fullerton) joining the league.

Breakup
In 1989 Bishop Montgomery and founding member St. Paul dropped and were replaced by Loyola High School and St. John Bosco. Newly opened Santa Margarita joined in 1990, but this would mark the beginning of the end for the Angelus League.

As the only member in South Orange County, Santa Margarita faced longer distances to travel for away games than any other school, and their principal sought to get them admitted to a more local public school league.  The public high schools strongly opposed the move, observing that their recruitment was limited to their school district, whereas the private schools had no geographic restrictions on recruitment. Nevertheless, the push to "regionalize" Catholic school sports won out, and the Angelus League was disbanded at the end of the 1991–92 school year. Angelus League teams had won 30 Southern Section championships in its 31 years, including 11 in football.

Starting fall 1992, Bishop Amat, St. John Bosco, and Loyola entered the Del Rey League, joining other Catholic schools in Los Angeles County. The others members joined public school leagues in Orange County: Santa Margarita to the Sea View League, Servite and Rosary the Sunset League, and Mater Dei the South Coast League.

Serra League
In 1999, the league was re-formed as a football-only league called the Serra League (named for Catholic missionary Junípero Serra), with Servite, Mater Dei, St. John Bosco, and Santa Margarita at its core. In 2001, the Southern Section council approved Bishop Amat and Loyola to join the league, in essence reconstituting the old Angelus League.

This lasted until 2006, when Loyola and Bishop Amat were moved to the Mission League and were replaced by Orange Lutheran and JSerra. The post-realignment conference was renamed the Trinity League.

Recent developments
In 2008, Rosary Academy became the only all-girls school in the conference. St. Margaret's Episcopal School joined the league as a lacrosse affiliate in 2005, winning the Trinity League title from 2007-2013 before its departure in 2014.

Champions
Each current member has won at least one CIF-SS championship, Mater Dei (8), Servite (4), and St. John Bosco (2) having won more than one. Each school has also won at least one State championship, Mater Dei (2), and St. John Bosco (2) having won more than one.

Football
The Trinity League is one of the most competitive high school football leagues in the country. St. John Bosco was declared winner of the 2022 and 2019 High School Football National Championship, and Mater Dei were national champions in 1994, 1996, 2017, 2018, 2020, and 2021. From 2016 to 2021, these two schools alone sent 130 players to NCAA Division I football programs, and their rivalry and recruiting efforts have been compared to the D1 level.

The league was named the toughest in the nation by MaxPreps in 2019, and the second toughest in 2013 and 2010. MaxPreps also named Mater Dei, St. John Bosco, and Servite as the teams with the second, third, and fifth toughest schedules in the nation for the 2022 season.

Notable athletic alumni

JSerra

Nick Harris (2015), current NFL offensive lineman for the Cleveland Browns
Austin Hedges (2011), current MLB catcher for the San Diego Padres
Royce Lewis (2017), first overall pick in the 2017 Major League Baseball Draft
Dante Pettis (2014), current NFL wide receiver for the New York Giants
Chase Strumpf (2016), a second baseman in the Chicago Cubs organization
Davis Wendzel (2016), a third baseman in the Texas Rangers organization

Mater Dei

Matt Barkley (2009), current NFL quarterback for the San Francisco 49ers
Colt Brennan (2002), former NFL quarterback for the Oakland Raiders and Washington Redskins
LeRon Ellis (1987), former NBA power forward and center for the Miami Heat, Charlotte Hornets, and Los Angeles Clippers
Danny Espinosa (2005), current MLB second baseman for the Washington Nationals
Reggie Geary (1992), former NBA guard for the San Antonio Spurs and Cleveland Cavaliers
Tiki Ghosn (1995), defensive back on the undefeated National Championship team in 1995; professional mixed martial arts fighter, at one time competing in Strikeforce MMA, the WEC, and the Ultimate Fighting Championship
Matt Grootegoed (2000), former NFL linebacker for the Detroit Lions and Tampa Bay Buccaneers
Vince Hizon (1988), American-born former Philippine Basketball Association player
Khaled Holmes (2008), current NFL Center for the Indianapolis Colts
Mike Hopkins (1988), former NCAA basketball guard, former assistant coach at Syracuse University and current head coach at Washington Huskies
John Huarte (1960), Heisman Trophy winner (1964) at Notre Dame and former NFL quarterback for the Bears, Chiefs, Eagles, Patriots, and Jets
Chris Jackson (1988), former NFL Wide receiver for the Dolphins, Packers, Titans, Seahawks, & Buccaneers
Stanley Johnson (2014), No. 1 F/G recruit commits to play at Arizona Wildcats.
Taylor King (2007), former NCAA basketball forward for Villanova University
Matt Leinart (2001), Heisman Trophy winner (2004) and current NFL quarterback for the Oakland Raiders.
Bobby Meacham (1978), current MLB First-Base Coach for the Houston Astros and former shortstop for the New York Yankees
Kaleena Mosqueda-Lewis (2011), current NCAA women's basketball guard for the University of Connecticut Huskies
Robbie Rogers (2005), current MLS winger for the Los Angeles Galaxy
Jamal Sampson (2001), former NBA forward-center for the Bucks, Lakers, Hornets, Kings, and Nuggets
Sergio Santos (2002), current MLB relief pitcher for the Toronto Blue Jays
Miles Simon (1994), current NCAA basketball analyst for ESPN and former NBA guard for the Orlando Magic
D. J. Strawberry (2003), former NBA point guard for the Phoenix Suns
Matt Treanor (1994), current MLB catcher for the Los Angeles Dodgers
David Wear (2009), current NCAA basketball forward for the UCLA Bruins
Travis Wear (2009), current NCAA Basketball forward for the UCLA Bruins
Larry Williams, NFL player
Max Wittek (2011), former  NCAA football quarterback for the USC Trojans
Greg Woepse silver medalist at the 1979 Pan Am Games in the pole vault
JT Daniels (2017) Current Starting Quarterback for the Georgia Bulldogs after transferring from the USC Trojans
Amon-Ra St. Brown (2017) Current Wide Receiver for the Detroit Lions

Servite
Steve Beuerlein (1983), Former Notre Dame and NFL quarterback.
Derek Brown (1989), NFL running back
Steve Buechele (1979), MLB third baseman.
Patrick Cantlay (2010), golfer
Sean Estrada (2003), University of Pennsylvania, San Francisco 49ers Offensive lineman.
Cody Fajardo (2010), quarterback at the University of Nevada
Ben Francisco (1999), MLB outfielder for the Philadelphia Phillies
Chris Galippo (2007), Middle Linebacker at University of Southern California and US Army Bowl MVP
Ryan Garko (1999), MLB first baseman for the Seattle Mariners
A. J. Gass (1993), former CFL player.
Dennis Sean Houlton (1997), MLB pitcher
Cole Irvin (2012), MLB pitcher for the Oakland Athletics
Frank Kalil (1977), NFL & USFL center
Ryan Kalil (2003), Offensive lineman at the University of Southern California starting center for the Carolina Panthers.
Matt Kalil (2008), offensive tackle at USC and member of the Minnesota Vikings
Blaine Nye (1964), former NFL offensive lineman, and economics consultant.
Chris Pontius, (2005) soccer player, D.C. United midfielder
Marc Rzepczynski (2003), Major League Baseball pitcher
Turk Schonert (1975), former Stanford and NFL quarterback, Buffalo Bills offensive coordinator
Matt Slater (2003), NFL wide receiver for the New England Patriots
Kurt Vollers (1997), former NFL tackle
Matt Willis (2002), NFL Wide receiver for the Denver Broncos
Mike Witt (1978), MLB pitcher, pitched perfect game September 30, 1984.

St. John Bosco
Josh Rosen (2014), former UCLA and current Miami Dolphins quarterback
Steve Carfino (1980), former basketball player for the Iowa Hawkeyes and Australian National Basketball League
James Cotton (1992), former NBA player with the Seattle SuperSonics
Joe Cowan, (2003), holds numerous school records in track and field as well as football; played for the UCLA Bruins' football program.
Patrick Cowan, (2004), an NFL free agent who was signed to New Orleans Saints but later released. Former starting quarterback for the UCLA Bruins football team.
Tim DeRuyter (1981), American football coach
Nomar Garciaparra (1991), from 1996 to 2009, played for the Boston Red Sox, Chicago Cubs, Los Angeles Dodgers, and Oakland Athletics. He was most famous during his tenure with Boston Red Sox during which he was a member of the "Holy Trinity of Shortstop", along with Derek Jeter and Alex Rodriguez.
Jelani Gardner (1992), former McDonald's All American basketball player for Cal and Pepperdine
Todd Husak (1996), former Stanford and NFL Quarterback
Dennis Lamp (1971), from 1977 through 1992, Lamp pitched for the Chicago Cubs (1977–80), Chicago White Sox (1981–83), Toronto Blue Jays (1984–86), Oakland Athletics (1987), Boston Red Sox (1988–91) and Pittsburgh Pirates.
Evan Longoria, (2003), San Francisco Giants third baseman.
Leon McFadden, (2009), Cleveland Browns cornerback.
Keith Price, (2009), starting quarterback for the Washington Huskies football team
Bud Smith (1996), MLB pitcher for the St. Louis Cardinals during the 2001–2002 season. He is noted for being one of only 18 pitchers in MLB history since 1900 to throw a no-hitter during their rookie season.
Bryce Treggs (2012), former wide receiver for Cal and in the NFL with the San Francisco 49ers, Cleveland Browns and Philadelphia Eagles

Santa Margarita Catholic
 Griffin Canning - pitcher for the Los Angeles Angels
 Gavin Escobar – National Football League tight end for the Dallas Cowboys
 Kris Farris, football player
 Erika Figge – Member of the United States women's national water polo team, 2007 Pan American Games Gold medalist
 Brian Finneran – former National Football League wide receiver for the Atlanta Falcons
 Beau Hossler – Amateur golfer, finished 29th at 2012 U.S. Open
 Michael Hoyos – Argentine soccer player
 Jared Hughes – MLB pitcher for the Pittsburgh Pirates
 Katie McLaughlin – Swimmer
 Carson Palmer – Two-time Pro Bowl National Football League quarterback formerly played for Arizona Cardinals, 2002 Heisman Trophy winner
 Doug Reinhardt – American League baseball player and television personality.
 Mark Restelli – Canadian Football League linebacker currently playing for Edmonton Eskimos
 Chris Rix – Starting quarterback for the Florida State Seminoles (2001–2004), now broadcast announcer for Fox Sports
 Amy Rodriguez – Member of the United States women's national soccer team, 2008 Summer Olympics Gold medalist
 Jason Stiles – American football player
 Klay Thompson – 11th overall pick in the 2011 NBA draft, currently plays for the Golden State Warriors
 Mychel Thompson – former NBA player for the Cleveland Cavaliers
 Trayce Thompson – baseball player
 Max Tuerk – chosen in the 2016–2017 NFL draft for the San Diego Chargers, played at USC and started all four years left tackle

Orange Lutheran High School 

 Cole Winn - pitcher in the Texas Rangers organization.  Top prospect and picked #15 overall.
 Garrett Frechette - 1st Baseman in San Francisco Giants organization
 Jasiah Dixon - Outfielder in Pittsburgh Pirates organization
 Garrett Mitchell - Outfielder and top prospect in the Milwaukee Brewers organization. Picked in 1st round in 2020.
 Derek Chan - NY Red Bulls 2 Goalkeeper
 Stanley Berryhill III - Wide Receiver for the Atlanta Falcons
 Kavaughn Scott - Forward for the NW Tasmania Thunder
 Jason Martin - Outfielder who has played for the Texas Rangers, Pittsburgh Pirates, and the Los Angeles Dodgers
 Gabe York - Shooting Guard for the Indiana Pacers.  Played 4 years at the University of Arizona. 
 Gerrit Cole - Pitcher for the New York Yankees. He played for the Pittsburgh Pirates and the Houston Astros. Regarded as one of the best pitchers in baseball. Former #1 overall pick. 
 Brandon Maurer - Pitched for the Seattle Mariners, San Diego Padres, and the Kansas City Royals. 
 Austin Pettis - Played wide receiver for the St. Louis Rams.  Spent 4 years at Boise State. 
 Aaron Corp - Former top recruit of USC.  Finished college career at Richmond.  Signed to practice squads for Buffalo Bills, Dallas Cowboys, and Miami Dolphins. 
 Andrew Thurman - Former 2nd round pick of the Houston Astros.  Spent time in the Astros, Braves, and Dodgers organizations over his big league career. 
 Hannes Daube - Member of the Men's USA Water Polo team and competed in 2022 Olympics. 
 Amber Neben - Cyclist for the US Cycling Team.  Competed in 3 Olympic Games.

References

CIF Southern Section leagues
Sports leagues established in 2006